NA-51 (Tribal Area-XII) was a constituency for the National Assembly of Pakistan comprising Bannu, Peshawar, Lakki Marwat, Dera Ismail Khan, Tank, and Kohat subdivisions.

Members of Parliament

1997–1999: NA-34 (Tribal Area-XII)

2002–2018: NA-47 (Tribal Area-XII)

Since 2018-2022: NA-51 (Tribal Area-XII)

Election 1997 

The national assembly elections were held on 03 Feb 1997. Haji Baz Gul Afridi an Independent candidate won by a big majority in NA-34 Tribal
Area-VIII.

Election 2002 

General elections were held on 10 Oct 2002. Naseem Afridi an Independent candidate won by 10,341 votes.

Election 2008 

The result of general election 2008 in this constituency is given below.

Result 
Zafar Beg Bhittani succeeded in the election 2008 and became the member of National Assembly.

Election 2013 

General election 2013 were held on May 11, 2013. The election was won by Qaiser Jamal of Pakistan Tehreek-e-Insaf.

Election 2018 

General elections were held on 25 July 2018.

See also
NA-50 (Tribal Area-XI)
NA-52 (Islamabad-I)

References

External links 
 Election result's official website

51
51